Graham Hill (1929–1975) was a British racing driver.

Graham Hill may also refer to:

 Graham Hill (academic), Zimbabwean veterinary surgeon
 Graham Hill (judge) (1938–2005), Australian judge
 Graham Hill (theologian) (born 1969), Australian theologian